The Mkhondo Local Municipality is a Local Municipality in Mpumalanga, South Africa. The council consists of thirty-eight members elected by mixed-member proportional representation. Nineteen councillors are elected by first-past-the-post voting in nineteen wards, while the remaining nineteen are chosen from party lists so that the total number of party representatives is proportional to the number of votes received. In the election of 1 November 2021 the African National Congress (ANC) won a majority of twenty-one seats.

Results 
The following table shows the composition of the council after past elections.

December 2000 election

The following table shows the results of the 2000 election.

March 2006 election

The following table shows the results of the 2006 election.

May 2011 election

The following table shows the results of the 2011 election.

August 2016 election

The following table shows the results of the 2016 election.

November 2021 election

The following table shows the results of the 2021 election.

By-elections from November 2021
The following by-elections were held to fill vacant ward seats in the period since the election in November 2021.

Although the ANC had a majority in the council, an independent mayor and an ATM speaker were elected, after ANC factions could not agree on a single candidate for the positions. The ANC expelled 6 councillors, including the former mayor. While one was a PR councillor, and was replaced by the party, five were ward councillors, resulting in by-elections on 14 December 2022. The ANC candidates won all five seats, restoring the party's majority in the council.

References

Mkhondo